Santa Fe Lake is the name of two waterbodies:  a reservoir in  south of downtown Williams in North Central Arizona, and a natural lake in the southern Sangre de Cristo Mountains near Ski Santa Fe in Santa Fe County, New Mexico. The reservoir is behind Santa Fe Dam, built in red sandstone. It is named after the Atchison, Topeka, and Santa Fe Railway, which stored the reservoir's water for its steam locomotives traveling through Williams. The natural lake is formed by snowmelt from Tesuque Peak and Lake Peak. It was named after the nearby state capital of Santa Fe, New Mexico, which was founded in 1610 as the capital of the Spanish province of Santa Fe de Nuevo México.

Fish species
 Rainbow trout
 Brown trout
 Crappie
 Sunfish
 Catfish (Channel)
 Yellow perch

External links
Arizona Boating Locations Facilities Map
Arizona Fishing Locations Map
Video of Santa Fe Lake (reservoir)

References

Bodies of water of Santa Fe County, New Mexico
Reservoirs in Coconino County, Arizona
Lakes of New Mexico
Reservoirs in Arizona